The 1868 City of Nelson by-election was a by-election held on 24 December 1868 in the  electorate during the 4th New Zealand Parliament.

The by-election was caused by the resignation of the incumbent MP Edward Stafford. The by-election was won by Nathaniel Edwards.

Results
The following table gives the election result:

References

Nelson 1868
1868 elections in New Zealand
Politics of Nelson, New Zealand